The 2012 Capital One Bowl, the 66th edition of the game, was a post-season American college football bowl game, held on January 2, 2012 at the Florida Citrus Bowl in Orlando, Florida as part of the 2011–12 NCAA Bowl season.

The game, which was telecast at 1:00 p.m. ET on ESPN, featured the #9 South Carolina Gamecocks from the Southeastern Conference versus the #20 Nebraska Cornhuskers from the Big Ten Conference.

In the third quarter, South Carolina receiver Alshon Jeffery and Nebraska corner Alfonzo Dennard were involved in a fight, resulting in both players being ejected.

Down 13–9 at the end of the first half, South Carolina quarterback Connor Shaw took the snap from the Gamecocks' own 49-yard line with 0:06 seconds remaining. With 0:02 remaining, Shaw heaved a Hail Mary pass, which was caught at the 4-yard line by Jeffery, who dove into the endzone for a touchdown as time expired. South Carolina went on to win 30–13, and Jeffery was named MVP of the game.

This game is notable Gamecocks football history for being the first 11 win season for the South Carolina football program. In turn, it ultimately led to their first top-10 final ranking in the major college football polls.

References

Capital One Bowl
Citrus Bowl (game)
Nebraska Cornhuskers football bowl games
South Carolina Gamecocks football bowl games
Capital One Bowl
Capital One Bowl